Chittu Kuruvi is a 1978 Indian Tamil-language drama film starring Sivakumar, Sumithra, Senthamarai, Suruli Rajan and Vennira Aadai Moorthy. The film was directed by Devaraj–Mohan, and released on 9 June 1978.

Plot

Cast 
 Sivakumar as Raja
 Sumithra as Chittu
 Meera
 S. N. Lakshmi
 Senthamarai
 Suruli Rajan
 Vennira Aadai Moorthy
 Pushpalatha

Production 
Chittu Kuruvi was directed by Devaraj–Mohan and was also produced by them under Vishnupriya Creations. The cinematography was handled by R. N. K. Prasad. The dialogues were written by lyricist Vaali. The film was launched on 17 November 1977 with Devaraj–Mohan's mentor director P. Madhavan and cinematographer P. N. Sundaram starting the shoot. Majority of the film was shot in and around the villages near Mysore such as Talakadu and Malangi and was completed within 20 days.

Soundtrack 
The music was composed by Ilaiyaraaja and lyrics written by Vaali. The songs "En Kanmani", "Unna Nambi" and "Adada Maamara" became hugely popular. The song "En Kanmani" was one of the earliest Indian songs to be composed in Counterpoint.

Release
Chittu Kuruvi was released on 9 June 1978.

References

External links 
 

1970s Tamil-language films
1978 drama films
1978 films
Films scored by Ilaiyaraaja
Indian drama films